Tyrone Vickery (born 31 May 1990) is a former Australian rules footballer who played for the Richmond Football Club and Hawthorn Football Club in the Australian Football League (AFL). He is the son of former Collingwood player John Vickery.

Junior career
As a junior, Vickery played for Sandringham in the TAC Cup. At age 17 and when completing his second last year at Haileybury College, he suffered a ruptured anterior cruciate ligament when his right knee collapsed under a tackle. He faced ten months away from football but returned to represent the Victorian Metro side in the Under-18 National Championships where he won All-Australian selection.

AFL career

Richmond (2009–2016)
Vickery was drafted by the Richmond Football Club with the eighth overall pick in the 2008 National Draft and made his AFL debut in round 12 of the 2009 AFL season. He went on to play 23 games across his first two seasons, kicking eight goals.

In 2011, Vickery was shifted to a full-time forward role. He played every game for the season and kicked 35 goals, placing second in the club's goal kicking tally. He also received the Kevin Bartlett medal for a fifth-placed finish in the club's best and fairest award.

An injury received in pre-season cruelled his 2012 campaign, limiting him to only nine games.

In 2013 however, he played 21 games and kicked 27 goals, again placing second in club's goal kicking. In the Tigers' round 14 matchup against , his 18 disposal, 11 mark and one goal performance won him best-afield honours and the Ian Stewart Medal. Vickery also played in Richmond's first final in 12 years and booted two goals on the day.

He played just 12 games in 2014 as competition came from fellow Tiger, Ben Griffiths for the second key-forward role in Richmond's game structure. In round 18 2014, Vickery struck and concussed  ruckman Dean Cox in a boundary-side ruck contest. He was suspended for four weeks by the AFL Tribunal and offered a public apology for the incident.

In 2015, Vickery found himself again in favour with coach, Damien Hardwick who began frequently playing him alongside both Ben Griffiths and former Coleman Medallist, Jack Riewoldt. Vickery finished the season with 31 goals across 15 games, second at the club behind Riewoldt.

Despite a relatively strong start to season 2016, Vickery would play just six of the club's final 11 games. Over the period he struggled to impact the game outside of his goal-scoring work, averaging only eight disposals per game. His final game, a two-goal performance, came in round 21 against . After 119 matches and 158 goals with Richmond, he announced he would be exploring his options as a restricted free agent.

Hawthorn (2017)
In October 2016, Vickery joined  as a restricted free agent after Richmond announced they would not match the contract offer. Richmond received pick 29 in the 2016 draft as compensation, and drafted Shai Bolton who was playing for Sth Fremantle in the WAFL.  In November 2017, Vickery announced his retirement from the AFL due to losing passion for the game.

Statistics

|- style=background:#EAEAEA
| 2009 ||  || 29
| 9 || 5 || 1 || 22 || 56 || 78 || 22 || 17 || 79 || 0.6 || 0.1 || 2.4 || 6.2 || 8.7 || 2.4 || 1.9 || 8.8 || 0
|-
| 2010 ||  || 29
| 14 || 3 || 3 || 37 || 76 || 113 || 25 || 30 || 122 || 0.2 || 0.2 || 2.6 || 5.4 || 8.1 || 1.8 || 2.1 || 8.7 || 0
|- style=background:#EAEAEA
| 2011 ||  || 29
| 22 || 36 || 19 || 135 || 117 || 252 || 95 || 39 || 156 || 1.6 || 0.9 || 6.1 || 5.3 || 11.5 || 4.3 || 1.8 || 7.1 || 2
|-
| 2012 ||  || 29
| 9 || 7 || 5 || 41 || 32 || 73 || 21 || 21 || 59 || 0.8 || 0.6 || 4.6 || 3.6 || 8.1 || 2.3 || 2.3 || 6.6 || 0
|- style=background:#EAEAEA
| 2013 ||  || 29
| 21 || 27 || 19 || 157 || 105 || 262 || 116 || 33 || 167 || 1.3 || 0.9 || 7.5 || 5.0 || 12.5 || 5.5 || 1.6 || 8.0 || 1
|-
| 2014 ||  || 29
| 12 || 23 || 10 || 80 || 47 || 127 || 46 || 27 || 81 || 1.9 || 0.8 || 6.7 || 3.9 || 10.6 || 3.8 || 2.3 || 6.8 || 1
|- style=background:#EAEAEA
| 2015 ||  || 29
| 15 || 31 || 9 || 108 || 50 || 158 || 73 || 23 || 85 || 2.1 || 0.6 || 7.2 || 3.3 || 10.5 || 4.9 || 1.5 || 5.7 || 4
|-
| 2016 ||  || 29
| 17 || 26 || 15 || 90 || 51 || 141 || 68 || 34 || 37 || 1.5 || 0.9 || 5.3 || 3.0 || 8.3 || 4.0 || 2.0 || 2.2 || 0
|- style=background:#EAEAEA
| 2017 ||  || 27
| 6 || 2 || 6 || 29 || 32 || 61 || 14 || 17 || 58 || 0.3 || 1.0 || 4.8 || 5.3 || 10.2 || 2.3 || 2.8 || 9.7 || 0
|- class="sortbottom"
! colspan=3| Career
! 125 !! 160 !! 87 !! 699 !! 566 !! 1265 !! 480 !! 241 !! 844 !! 1.3 !! 0.7 !! 5.6 !! 4.5 !! 10.1 !! 3.8 !! 1.9 !! 6.8 !! 8
|}

Honours and achievements
Individual
 Ian Stewart Medal: 2013
  leading goalkicker: 2017
 Under 18 All-Australian team: 2008

Personal life
Vickery married Russian-born and naturalised-Australian professional tennis player Arina Rodionova in December 2015.

References

External links

Ty Vickery's statistics from Footy Wire

1990 births
Living people
People educated at Haileybury (Melbourne)
Richmond Football Club players
Australian rules footballers from Melbourne
Sandringham Dragons players
Hawthorn Football Club players
Box Hill Football Club players